Route 39 is a  southwest-northeast route through the towns of Harwich, Brewster and Orleans, on Cape Cod, Massachusetts.  It begins and ends at Route 28, acting as a bypass route for those not wishing to follow 28 through Harwich Port and Chatham.

Route description
The route begins at Massachusetts 28 in the village of Harwich Port and for its first , along Sisson Road and a portion of Main Street in Harwich Center,  it is coextensive with Route 124. Route 124 then turns north along Pleasant Lake Ave, leaving the concurrency. Route 39 continues through the village of East Harwich intersecting Route 137 before entering Brewster. After a half-mile in Brewster, the road becomes the town line between Brewster and Orleans for another mile before officially leaving Brewster.

Major intersections

References

Numbered routes in Massachusetts
Transportation in Barnstable County, Massachusetts
Brewster, Massachusetts
Orleans, Massachusetts
Harwich, Massachusetts